The death toll in a suicide bombing in Iraq's eastern province of Diyala rose to 50. A further 58 people were wounded in the attack at a funeral for a Shi'ite Muslim militia fighter in Muqdadiya, 80 km (50 miles) northeast of Baghdad.

See also
 List of terrorist incidents, January–June 2016

References

2016 murders in Iraq
21st-century mass murder in Iraq
Mass murder in 2016
Terrorist incidents in Iraq in 2016